Dorsa Harker is a wrinkle ridge at  in Mare Crisium on the Moon. It is 213 km long and was named after Alfred Harker, an English petrologist, in 1976.

References

Harker